Shyroka Balka is a settlement in Horlivka municipality of Donetsk Oblast of eastern Ukraine, at 43.5 km NNE from the centre of Donetsk city.

During the War in Donbass, in 2015, the settlement was taken under control of pro-Russian forces of the self-proclaimed Donetsk People's Republic. In March 2023, the General Staff of the Armed Forces of Ukraine reported Russian shelling in the settlement.

Demographics
Native language as of the Ukrainian Census of 2001:
Ukrainian 71.28%
Russian 28.51%
Belorussian 0.21%

References

Villages in Horlivka Raion